Colin J. Bell (1 April 1938 – 9 October 2021) was a Scottish journalist, broadcaster and author.

Bell was educated at St Paul's School, London, and King's College, Cambridge, where he graduated in 1959 with a first-class degree in the Historical Tripos. He went on to become a journalist with various newspapers, including The Scotsman, and was once editor of The Scots Independent. He made the transition to broadcasting with BBC Radio Scotland in 1984.

Bell served the Scottish National Party as Executive Vice-Chairman, 1978-1984 and Campaign Director, Euro elections 1984. In 1979 he stood as SNP Parliamentary Candidate for West Edinburgh and also European Parliamentary Candidate for North East Scotland. In June 1996, he was the 13th Scot to be presented with the Oliver Brown Award. He later left the SNP to join the Scottish Socialist Party.

Bell wrote Murder Trail: Death for a Living. He served as Rector of Aberdeen University from 1991 to 1993.

Bell died on 9 October 2021, at the age of 83.

Footnotes

1938 births
2021 deaths
Scottish newspaper editors
Alumni of King's College, Cambridge
Scottish National Party politicians
Scottish Socialist Party politicians
Scottish radio presenters
Scottish National Party parliamentary candidates

Rectors of the University of Aberdeen